Raymond Field is a multi-purpose stadium in Wolfville, Nova Scotia. It is the home of the Acadia University Axemen football and soccer teams as well as the Acadia Axewomen soccer and rugby teams.  It can seat 3,000 (5,000 with standing room), and was built in 1966. In 2007, the natural grass was replaced with FieldTurf and the running track was replaced with an 8-lane all-weather surface.

External links
 Article on new FieldTurf and track renovations

Acadia University
Sports venues in Nova Scotia
Soccer venues in Canada
Canadian football venues
Athletics (track and field) venues in Canada
Multi-purpose stadiums in Canada